Woodberry is a surname. Notable people with the surname include:

Billy Woodberry, American film director
Dennis Woodberry (born 1961), American football player
J. Dudley Woodberry (born 1934), American scholar and Protestant missionary
Joan Woodberry (1921–2010), Australian writer
London Woodberry (born 1991), American soccer player
Rosa Louise Woodberry (1869–1932), American journalist, educator
Steve Woodberry (born 1971), American basketball player
Terry Woodberry (born 1963), American soccer player